Edna Shavit (April 25, 1935 – 14 June 2015) was an Israeli professor affiliated with the theater department of Tel Aviv University.

She was married to Yoram Gal between 1994 and 2003. 

In the 1960s, Shavit played Lucky in a local production of Waiting for Godot and went on to direct the play in the 1970s  
Shavit was the director of You and Me and the Next War, a satirical cabaret by Hanoch Levin with songs set to music by Alex Kagan and Beni Nagari.

In 2006, she was awarded the Levi Prize for life achievement.

References

Israeli Jews
Israeli theatre directors
Academic staff of Tel Aviv University
1935 births
2015 deaths
Tel Aviv University alumni
People from Haifa